Pilawala is a village in Sri Lanka. It is located within the Central Province, about 9 km easterly from Kandy. There is an Access route via Sirimalwatta - Yakgahapitiya - Menikhinna road or by the Shuttle Bus route Number 621, Menikhinna - Kandy.

See also
List of towns in Central Province, Sri Lanka

External links

Populated places in Kandy District